Mount St. Alphonsus Seminary (later Mount St. Alphonsus Retreat Center), located in Esopus, New York, was an American Roman Catholic seminary founded in 1907 by the Congregation of the Most Holy Redeemer, more commonly known as the Redemptorist Fathers and Brothers. It operated as a seminary until 1985, after which it became a center for meetings and spiritual retreats for the people of the Hudson Valley in New York. In 2012, the Mount ceased operations and was leased to the Bruderhof Communities who use the building for their Mount Academy.

History
Upon the arrival of some Belgian Redemptorists in the United States in 1838, they began the mission work for which they had been established in Italy a century earlier by their founder, Alphonsus Maria de' Liguori, C.Ss.R., a bishop and noted spiritual writer, among the Native Americans who lived along the frontier of the young nation. By 1850, the nine Redemptorist communities in the United States were formed into the independent Province of Baltimore.

A seminary was soon opened in Maryland for the training of the young candidates to the Congregation. By the beginning of the 20th century, however, it was felt by the Redemptorists that the locales they had chosen for their seminarians had not been healthful. In 1904, with financing by the family of Father Augustine Duper, C.Ss.R., a native of the Bronx, the decision was made to move the seminary to Esopus, where they had purchased a 235-acre property, which eventually grew to over 400 acres.

The main portion of the building was designed by William Licking; the chapel was designed by Brother Max Monz, C.Ss.R. in Romanesque style. Upon completion of construction in 1907, theological studies began to be given at the seminary for the young men of the province. The school also served as a locale for many activities of the local Catholic population. Additionally, the faculty provided spiritual care to their neighbors at a mission chapel in the town, as well as assisting the Church of the Presentation parish in neighboring Port Ewen, and Sacred Heart Church in Esopus. They oversaw, as well, a small cloistered monastery of Redemptoristine nuns located on the grounds.

In 1985, due to the declining numbers of students, the decision was made by the province to relocate their seminarians to study at the Washington Theological Union in Washington, D.C. The seminary building was then refashioned into a retreat center, serving people in the greater New York area, New Jersey and Connecticut. It was also a popular site for weddings due to the beauty of the grounds. By the time the seminary closed, some 1,300 Redemptorist seminarians had been ordained as Catholic priests there.

Because of their aging membership, in 2011 the leaders of the province determined they could no longer maintain the Mount and the entirely facility would have to be closed. It was felt that this would free them to continue their primary ministry to the poor and most abandoned. The Mount Seminary then closed as of January 1, 2012.

In May 2012, the property was leased by the Bruderhof community, that is currently using it as a community location that houses its Mount Academy high school for the young of their religious community. The chapel has been left intact.

Notable alumni
 Rev. John A. Collins, C.Ss.R. - Chief of Chaplains of the United States Air Force
Archbishop Edward Joseph Gilbert, C.Ss.R. - Archbishop of Port of Spain
Bishop William Tibertus McCarty, C.Ss.R. - Bishop of Rapid City
Rev. Francis X. Murphy, C.Ss.R. - also known as Xavier Rynne,  the pseudonym he published his articles under during the Second Vatican Council.
Cardinal Joseph W. Tobin, C.Ss.R. - Archbishop of Indianapolis, Archbishop of Newark

References

Catholic seminaries in the United States
Educational institutions established in 1907
1907 establishments in New York (state)
Educational institutions disestablished in 1985
Former theological colleges in the United States
Schools in Ulster County, New York
2012 disestablishments in New York (state)
seminary